The 2020 Sorcerous Stabber Orphen anime series is based on the light novel series of the same name written by Yoshinobu Akita and illustrated by Yuuya Kusaka. The new series remake is animated by Studio Deen and directed by Takayuki Hamana, with Reiko Yoshida handling series composition, and Takahiko Yoshida designing the characters. Showtaro Morikubo reprised his role as Orphen, while the rest of the characters had new voice actors. The 2020 remake was commemorated to celebrate the 25th anniversary of the anime series. It was initially set to premiere in 2019, but was rescheduled to premiere on January 7, 2020 to March 31, 2020 on AT-X, BS Fuji, Tokyo MX, and Wowow. The opening theme is "Calling U" performed by buzz★Vibes, and the ending theme is  performed by Mai Fuchigami.

Funimation has licensed the series for a simuldub.

An unaired OVA episode was bundled with the remake's second Blu-ray box set, which released on May 8, 2020.

A second season of the 2020 remake was announced with the title of Sorcerous Stabber Orphen: Battle of Kimluck. It aired from January 20 to March 31, 2021. The opening theme is "LIGHT of JUSTICE" performed by Showtaro Morikubo while the ending theme is  performed by Mai Fuchigami.

Series overview

Episode list

Season 1 (2020)

Season 2: Battle of Kimluck (2021)

Season 3: Chaos in Urbanrama (2023)

See also
 List of Sorcerous Stabber Orphen (1998 TV series) episodes

Notes

References

Sorcerous Stabber Orphen (2020)